The Mai-Idris Alooma Polytechnic is a state government higher education institution located in Geidam, Yobe State, Nigeria. The current rector is Hussaini Abatcha Geidam.

History 
The Mai-Idris Alooma Polytechnic was established in 1993.

Courses 
The institution offers the following courses;

 Science Laboratory Technology
 Computer Science
 Statistics
 Architectural Technology
 Electrical/Electronic Engineering Technology
 Accountancy
 Business Administration And Management

References 

Universities and colleges in Nigeria
1993 establishments in Nigeria